Campo Real is a town of around 6000 people in Spain, around 20 kilometers east of Madrid.

It includes a notable church, the Iglesia de Santa Maria del Castillo.

The town was first recorded as Aldea Campo, during the Moorish period it was known as Campo de Almoacid.  It was given its current name ("royal field") by Philip II of Spain in 1580.

References

Municipalities in the Community of Madrid